Dongaata may refer to:

Dongaata (1997 film), directed by Kodi Ramakrishna starring Jagapati Babu and Soundarya
Dongaata (2015 film), directed by Vamsi Krishna starring Lakshmi Manchu and Adivi Sesh